The Sapotaceae are a family of flowering plants belonging to the order Ericales. The family includes about 800 species of evergreen trees and shrubs in around 65 genera (35-75, depending on generic definition). Their distribution is pantropical.

Many species produce edible fruits, or white blood-sap that is used to cleanse dirt, organically and manually, while others have other economic uses. Species noted for their edible fruits include Manilkara (sapodilla), Chrysophyllum cainito (star-apple or golden leaf tree), and Pouteria (abiu, canistel, lúcuma, mamey sapote). Vitellaria paradoxa (shi in several languages of West Africa and karité in French; also anglicized as shea) is also the source of an oil-rich nut, the source of edible shea butter, which is the major lipid source for many African ethnic groups and is also used in traditional and Western cosmetics and medications.  The "miracle fruit" Synsepalum dulcificum is also placed in the Sapotaceae.

Trees of the genus Palaquium (gutta-percha) produce an important latex with a wide variety of uses. The seeds of the tree Argania spinosa produce an edible oil, traditionally harvested in Morocco.

The family name is derived from zapote, a Mexican vernacular name for one of the plants (in turn derived from the Nahuatl tzapotl) and Latinised by Linnaeus as sapota, a name now treated as a synonym of Manilkara (also formerly known by the invalid name Achras).

Genera

Amorphospermum
 Aningeria
 Argania
 Aubregrinia
 Aulandra
 Autranella
 Baillonella
 Boerlagella Cogn. (also incl. in Pouteria)
 Breviea
 Burckella
 Capurodendron
 Chromolucuma
 Chrysophyllum
 Delpydora
 Diploknema
 Diploon
 Donella
 Eberhardtia
 Ecclinusa
 Elaeoluma
 Englerophytum
 Faucherea
 Gambeya
 Gluema
 Inhambanella
 Isonandra
 Labourdonnaisia
 Labramia
 Lecomtedoxa
 Letestua
 Madhuca
 Manilkara
 Mastichodendron
 Micropholis
 Mimusops
 Neohemsleya
 Neolemonniera
 Nesoluma
 Niemeyera
 Northia seychellana
 Omphalocarpum
 Palaquium
 Payena
 Pichonia
 Planchonella Pierre
 Pleioluma
 Pouteria
 Pradosia
 Pycnandra
 Sarcaulus
 Sarcosperma
 Sersalisia R.Br. (also incl. in Pouteria)
 Sideroxylon
 Spiniluma
 Synsepalum
 Tieghemella
 Tridesmostemon
 Tsebona
 Van-royena Aubrév. (also incl. in Pouteria)
 Vitellaria
 Vitellariopsis
 Xantolis

References

 
Ericales families